Embodiment 12:14 were an Australia Christian metal band formed in Adelaide, as Embodiment in 1992, initially they performed death metal. They released two albums, Elements of This Man-Made Man (1998) and Inroads Out (2005), before disbanding in 2006.

History 

Embodiment 12:14 were formed in Adelaide in 1992, as Embodiment, by Aaron Harslett on drums, Luke Martin on guitar, Ben Reid on guitar, and Darren Reid on lead vocals. Initially they played death metal and contributed tracks to three compilation albums by various artists. In 1997 they slightly changed their name to become Embodiment 12:14 due to an American band of similar name, Embodyment; the "12:14" was added as a reference to "a couple of verse’s taken from Phillipians 3 12-14."

They supported Metal and Hardcore acts, Agnostic Front, Anthrax, Good Clean Fun, Killswitch Engage and Chimaira. Embodiment 12:14 released their album, Elements of This Man-Made Man in 1998 via Trial & Error Records. The band has influenced metal and hardcore bands, Shai Hulud. In 2002 Trial & Error issued a split extended play with three tracks by Embodiment 12:14, "The Bridge Is Out", "Penknife" and "Coming of Age" and another four tracks by label mates, Not for You. Owen McGregor-Hart of Oz Music Project observed, "[they] give us 3 sharp tracks of emotion filled hardcore... [and] show us their true colours. Combining raw guitars, both screaming and melodic vocals and a strong rhythm section, you're left wish a sweet, sweet taste in your mouth from this release."

The group's second album, Inroads Out, appeared in 2003 and was recorded by the line-up of Darren Reid on vocals; Harslett on drums; Michael Wright on guitar; Kyle Bloksgaard on guitar and vocals; Bear (Greg Smith) on bass guitar; Rodger Smith on keyboards, vocals and programming; Tim Lawrence on rhythm guitar and vocal harmonies. It was recorded at Soundhouse Studio by Anj and produced by the group with Anj. Tracks received "consistent rotation" on Triple J, national youth radio.

Aidan Quinn of Punk Hardcore felt that with the album, "these dudes still have it, a lot more melodic-metal that basically could be summed up as Shai Hulud cross Inflames. Nice vocals, both melodic and heavy... amazing new guitar work, the addition of keys and solid drumming with heaps of stand out fills, make sure you check these guys out as they are the shit for melodic metalcore[...] with a huge focus on melody, technicality and a strong christian influence."

Members

 Aaron Harslett – drums (1992–2003)
 Luke Martin – guitar (1992-1995)
 Ben Reid – guitar (1992–98, 2003)
 Darren Reid – vocals (1992–2003, 2010)
 Chris Duggan – bass guitar (1994–95)
 Kane Jones – bass guitar (1995–98)
 Mike Wright – guitar, clean vocals (1995–2003)
 Tim Lawrence – guitar (1998–2003)
 Greg Smith – bass guitar (1998–2003)
 Kyle Bloksgaard – guitar, vocals (2003)
 Roger Smith – keys, programming, vocals (2003)
 Kelvin Sugars – drums (2010)
 Dave McGuire – guitar, vocals

Discography

Compilation appearances
Australian Metal Compilation I - Godspeed (Rowe; 1994)
Australian Metal Compilation II - The Raise the Dead (Rowe; 1995)
Australian Metal Compilation IV - Falling on Deaf Ears (Rowe; 1996)
While the City Sleeps Compilation (2001; 618 Records)

Studio albums
 Elements of This Man-Made Man (1998) – Trial & Error Records
 Inroads Out (2003) – Trial & Error Records (Trial033CD)

Split extended plays
 "The Bridge Is Out", "Penknife" and "Coming of Age" on Embodiment 12:14/Not for You Split EP (four tracks by Not for You) (2002) – Trial & Error Records

References

External links

  archived from the original on 7 September 2004, retrieved on 23 December 2018.

Musical groups from Adelaide
Australian metalcore musical groups
Australian Christian metal musical groups
Rowe Productions artists